The 1955 World Table Tennis Championships – Swaythling Cup (men's team) was the 22nd edition of the men's team championship.  

Japan won the gold medal defeating Czechoslovakia 5–3 in the final. England and Hungary won bronze medals after being defeated in the semi finals.

Medalists

Swaythling Cup tables

Group 1

Group 2

Group 3

Group 4

Semifinals

Final

See also
List of World Table Tennis Championships medalists

References

-